Drama is an album released by German singer and actress Carolin Fortenbacher in 2008.

Background 
It is her second album, after 2005's Zurück zu Mir, and features the song which she entered into the Grand Prix Vorentscheid 2008, as a possible German entry to Eurovision 2008, "Hinterm Ozean" (en: "Behind the ocean"). The album was produced by Frank Peterson, and was released by the Warner Music Group.

Track listing 
 "Hinterm Ozean" (Album version)
 "Du kannst mich verstehen"
 "Lass das Licht an"
 "Meine große Liebe"
 "Um die Welt in einem Tag"
 "Sie"
 "Happy Hour (Sorrento Moon)"
 "Dass du es bist"
 "Für eine Frau wie mich"
 "Liebesramadan"
 "Der hellste Stern"
 "Dein zweites Gesicht"
 "Ich nehm' den weiten Weg"

Charts

External links 
 Drama at Amazon.de
 Carolin Fortenbacher

Carolin Fortenbacher albums
2008 albums